This is a list of places within the ceremonial county of Lancashire, England. It refers to the present-day boundaries of Lancashire, which came into effect in 1974.

A

B

C

D

E

F

G

H

I

K

L

M

N

O

P

Q

R

S

T

U

W

Y

See also
 List of settlements in Lancashire by population
 Civil parishes in Lancashire
 List of places historically in Lancashire for pre-1974 boundaries
 List of places in England for lists in other counties

External links
Map of places in Lancashire compiled from this list
Some Lancashire villages

 Places
Lancashire
Places